Bong Joon-ho is a South Korean film director, producer, and screenwriter who began his career in 1994 after creating the short films White Man, Memories in My Frame, and Incoherence. In 1997, Bong wrote the feature film Motel Cactus, for which he also served as an assistant director. Two years later, he wrote Phantom: The Submarine, and later made his feature-length directorial debut with Barking Dogs Never Bite (2000). In the following years, Bong wrote and directed Memories of Murder (2003), The Host (2006), Mother (2009), and Snowpiercer (2013), films which received "universal acclaim" from critics.

After writing and producing 2014's Sea Fog, Bong co-wrote, directed, and produced the action-adventure film Okja, which earned a nomination for the Palme d'Or at the 70th Cannes Film Festival. While working on Snowpiercer, Bong was encouraged to write a play, which resulted in the creation and release of the film Parasite in 2019. The film received the Palme d'Or, acclaim from critics internationally, and numerous accolades. It also earned Bong the Academy Award for Best Director, further establishing him as a profound filmmaker around the world.

Production credits

Feature films

Short films

Television

Music videos

Performance credits

Critical response

See also 
 List of awards and nominations received by Bong Joon-ho

References

External links 
 
 Bong Joon-ho on KMDb

Bong Joon-ho